Helicinoidea is a taxonomic superfamily of land snails that have an operculum. In other words, they are terrestrial operculate gastropod mollusks. They are in the superfamily Neritoidea and are quite closely related to the marine and freshwater nerites.

Taxonomy 
The following families are within according to the taxonomy by Bouchet & Rocroi (2005):
 family Helicinidae
 † family Dawsonellidae
 † family Deaniridae
 family Neritiliidae
 family Proserpinellidae
 family Proserpinidae

References 

Gastropod superfamilies